Chionanthus henryae is a plant species native to the southeastern United States. It has been reported from Florida, Alabama, Georgia, Arkansas. Species is named for Mary Henry, an avid plant collected who collected many thousands of specimens, including the type of this species (from Okaloosa County, Florida in 1941).

References

henrya
Plants described in 1966
Flora of Florida